Jacobo Langsner (23 June 1927 – 10 August 2020) was a Uruguayan playwright who had a strong presence in the Uruguayan theatre from 1950 onwards. His work is a showcase of middle-class hypocrisy.

Langsner was born in Romuli, Kingdom of Romania in a Jewish family, and died, aged 93, in Buenos Aires, Argentina.

One of his most highly regarded works is Waiting for the Hearse. It was adapted into film in Argentina, another country where he was very successful.

Works 
 1938: Los elegidos, simultaneously in Buenos Aires and Montevideo.
 1951: El hombre incompleto, Sala Verdi (Montevideo).
 1953: El juego de Ifigenia, Solís Theatre (Montevideo).
 1953: Los artistas, Sala Verdi (Montevideo), directed by José Estruch, Club de Teatro.
 1962: Esperando la carroza, Comedia Nacional (Montevideo).
 1971: Ocho espías al champagne, Sala Verdi (Montevideo).
 1973: El tobogán, Teatro Odeón (Montevideo), directed by Omar Grasso, with China Zorrilla
 1973: Una corona para Benito, by the China Zorrilla Company. Teatro Odeón (Montevideo).
 El terremoto, by the Virginia Lago Company (Buenos Aires).
 La gotita, by the Brandoni-Bianchi Company (Buenos Aires).
 1981: La planta, Comedia Nacional (Montevideo).
 1984: Una margarita llamada Mercedes, by the China Zorrilla company.
 1992: De mis amores con Douglas Fairbanks, El Galpón Theatre (Montevideo)
 Locos de contento, by the company Oscar Martínez-Mercedes Morán.
 Otros paraísos, with Norman Briski and Cristina Banegas, Teatro Municipal General San Martín (Buenos Aires) and Comedia Nacional (Montevideo).
 2004: Damas y caballeros.

References

1927 births
2020 deaths
People from Bistrița-Năsăud County
Romanian Jews
Transylvanian Jews
Romanian emigrants to Uruguay
Naturalized citizens of Uruguay
Uruguayan Jews
Uruguayan people of Romanian-Jewish descent
Uruguayan dramatists and playwrights
Male dramatists and playwrights
20th-century Uruguayan male writers
20th-century Uruguayan writers
20th-century dramatists and playwrights
21st-century Uruguayan writers
21st-century Uruguayan male writers
21st-century dramatists and playwrights
Jewish dramatists and playwrights
Jewish Romanian writers